Branch water, also called branch, is water from a natural stream (a term primarily used in the southern United States); it may also refer to any plain water, such as tap water (rather than soda water) when added to a mixed drink. For example, "bourbon and branch" refers to bourbon whiskey with water. This water may have been naturally limestone-filtered by passing through underground limestone, which removes iron. As such, it is a traditional ingredient in the distillation of Kentucky bourbon.

References

Water